In Urdu language, Awami is the adjectival  form for Awam, the Urdu language word for common people.

The adjective appears in the following proper names:
Awami Colony, a neighbourhood of Landhi Town in Karachi, Sindh, Pakistan
Awami Front, was a front of six Muslim political parties in Uttar Pradesh, India
Awami Muslim League (Pakistan), a Pakistani political party 
Awami National Party, a secular and leftist Pashtun nationalist political party in Pakistan
Bangladesh Awami League, often simply called the Awami League or AL, one of the two major political parties of Bangladesh
National Awami Party, progressive political party in East and West Pakistan
National Awami Party (Bhashani), split-off from National Awami Party in East Pakistan
National Awami Party (Wali), Wali Khan faction of the National Awami Party was formed after the 1967 split in the original National Awami Party
National Awami Party (Muzaffar) or Bangladesh National Awami Party, political party in Bangladesh, successor of the Wali faction
Bangladesh National Awami Party-Bangladesh NAP, successor of the Bhashani faction in Bangladesh
Pakistan Awami Tehrik, a political party in Pakistan that took part in general elections in 1990 and 2002.
Awami Nastaliq, a typeface by SIL International

See also
Awami Muslim League (disambiguation)
Janata (disambiguation)